A list of films produced in Hong Kong in 1964:.

1964

References

External links
 IMDB list of Hong Kong films
 Hong Kong films of 1964 at HKcinemamagic.com

1964
Hong Kong
Flms